Panwan' is a village in the Nankana Sahib District, Punjab, Pakistan. It is one of the famous villages of Tehsil Shahkot.  Panwan is situated on the Lahore - Sheikhupura - Faisalabad Road.

References

Villages in Nankana Sahib District